Moses E. Lewis (July 26, 1854 – March 13, 1951) was the 18th Lieutenant Governor of Colorado, serving from 1915 to 1917 under George Alfred Carlson.

References

Lieutenant Governors of Colorado
1854 births
1951 deaths
People from Coal Valley, Illinois